The Black and Orange Cabins are a motel constructed next to Fort Bridger in southwest Wyoming. The cabins were originally constructed in 1925 along the Lincoln Highway, giving automobile tourist lodging accommodations while travelling through Wyoming. The site was active from 1925 until 1936. It was sold to a new owner in 1941, but was likely never again opened. The site remained essentailly abandoned from 1948 until 1996.

In 1996, the site was purchased by the Fort Bridger Historical Society and was then donated to the state, as it was located adjacent to the Fort Bridger historic site. The State of Wyoming began an extensive restoration project in 2007, including foundation stabilization of the cabins, and foundation, chimney, and roof repairs. This round of restoration was completed in June 2009.

References

External links
 Black and Orange Cabins page, Wyoming State Historic Preservation Office

Wyoming state historic sites
National Register of Historic Places in Uinta County, Wyoming
Lincoln Highway